KFOY (1060 kHz) is an AM radio station broadcasting a full-service/community radio format. Licensed to Sparks, Nevada, United States, the station serves the Reno area. The station is owned by Lotus Communications.

KFOY previously served as the Reno, Nevada Spanish language affiliate for the San Francisco Giants Radio Network.  KFOY also served as the Reno Spanish affiliate for the Las Vegas Raiders Radio Network.

On September 5, 2022 KFOY changed their format to conservative talk, branded as "Radio For America".

References

External links

FOY (AM)
Sparks, Nevada
Radio stations established in 2013
2013 establishments in Nevada
Lotus Communications stations